A speleothem is a geological formation by mineral deposits that accumulate over time in natural caves. Speleothems most commonly form in calcareous caves due to carbonate dissolution reactions. They can take a variety of forms, depending on their depositional history and environment. Their chemical composition, gradual growth, and preservation in caves make them useful paleoclimatic proxies.

Chemical and physical characteristics
More than 300 variations of cave mineral deposits have been identified. The vast majority of speleothems are calcareous, composed of calcium carbonate (CaCO3) minerals (calcite or aragonite). Less commonly, speleothems are made of calcium sulfate (gypsum or mirabilite) or opal. Speleothems of pure calcium carbonate or calcium sulfate are translucent and colorless. The presence of iron oxide or copper provides a reddish brown color. The presence of manganese oxide can create darker colors such as black or dark brown. Speleothems can also be brown due to the presence of mud and silt.

Many factors impact the shape and color of speleothems, including the chemical composition of the rock and water, water seepage rate, water flow direction, cave temperature, cave humidity, air currents, aboveground climate, and aboveground plant cover. Weaker flows and short travel distances form narrower stalagmites, while heavier flow and a greater fall distance tend to form broader ones.

Formation processes
Most cave chemistry involves calcium carbonate (CaCO3) containing rocks such as limestone or dolomite, composed of calcite or aragonite minerals. Carbonate minerals are more soluble in the presence of higher carbon dioxide (CO2) and lower temperatures. Calcareous speleothems form via carbonate dissolution reactions whereby rainwater reacts with soil CO2 to create weakly acidic water via the reaction:
H2O + CO2 → H2CO3

As the acidic water travels through the calcium carbonate bedrock from the surface to the cave ceiling, it dissolves the bedrock via the reaction:
CaCO3 + H2CO3 → Ca2+ + 2 HCO3−

When the solution reaches a cave, the lower pCO2 in the cave drives the precipitation of CaCO3 via the reaction:
Ca2+ + 2 HCO3− → CaCO3 + H2O + CO2

Over time, the accumulation of these precipitates form dripstones (stalagmites, stalactites), and flowstones, two of the major types of speleothems.

Climate proxies
Speleothem transects can provide paleoclimate records similar to those from ice cores or tree rings. Slow geometrical growth and incorporation of radioactive elements enables speleothems to be accurately and precisely dated over much of the late Quaternary by radiocarbon dating and uranium-thorium dating, as long as the cave is a closed system and the speleothem has not undergone recrystallization. Oxygen (δ18O) and carbon (δ13C) stable isotopes are used to track variation in rainfall temperature, precipitation, and vegetation changes over the past ~500,000 years. Variations in precipitation alter the width of speleothem rings: closed rings indicates little rainfall, wider spacing indicates heavier rainfall, and denser rings indicate higher moisture. Drip rate counting and trace element analysis of the water drops record short-term climate variations, such as El Niño–Southern Oscillation (ENSO) climate events. Exceptionally, climate proxy data from the early Permian period have been retrieved from speleothems dated to 289 million years ago sourced from infilled caves exposed by quarrying at the Richards Spur locality in Oklahoma.

Types and categories

Speleothems take various forms, depending on whether the water drips, seeps, condenses, flows, or ponds. Many speleothems are named for their resemblance to man-made or natural objects. Types of speleothems include:
 Dripstone is calcium carbonate in the form of stalactites or stalagmites
 Stalactites are pointed pendants hanging from the cave ceiling, from which they grow
 Soda straws are very thin but long stalactites with an elongated cylindrical shape rather than the usual more conical shape of stalactites
 Helictites are stalactites that have a central canal with twig-like or spiral projections that appear to defy gravity
 Include forms known as ribbon helictites, saws, rods, butterflies, hands, curly-fries, and "clumps of worms"
 Chandeliers are complex clusters of ceiling decorations
 Ribbon stalactites, or simply "ribbons", are shaped accordingly
 Stalagmites are the "ground-up" counterparts of stalactites, often blunt mounds
 Broomstick stalagmites are very tall and spindly
 Totem pole stalagmites are also tall and shaped like their namesakes
 Fried egg stalagmites are small, typically wider than they are tall
 Stalagnate results when stalactites and stalagmites meet or when stalactites reach the floor of the cave
 Flowstone is sheet like and found on cave floors and walls
 Draperies or curtains are thin, wavy sheets of calcite hanging downward
 Bacon is a drapery with variously colored bands within the sheet
 Rimstone dams, or gours, occur at stream ripples and form barriers that may contain water
 Stone waterfall formations simulate frozen cascades
 Cave crystals
 Dogtooth spar are large calcite crystals often found near seasonal pools
 Frostwork is needle-like growths of calcite or aragonite
 Moonmilk is white and cheese-like
 Anthodites are flower-like clusters of aragonite crystals
 Cryogenic calcite crystals are loose grains of calcite found on the floors of caves formed by segregation of solutes during freezing of water.
 Speleogens (technically distinct from speleothems) are formations within caves that are created by the removal of bedrock, rather than as secondary deposits. These include:
 Pillars
 Scallops
 Boneyard
 Boxwork
 Others
 Cave popcorn, also known as "coralloids" or "cave coral", are small, knobby clusters of calcite
 Cave pearls are the result of water dripping from high above, causing small "seed" crystals to turn over so often that they form into near-perfect spheres of calcium carbonate
 Snottites are colonies of predominantly sulfur oxidizing bacteria and have the consistency of "snot", or mucus
 Calcite rafts are thin accumulations of calcite that appear on the surface of cave pools
 Hells Bells, a particular speleothem found in the El Zapote cenote of Yucatan in the form of submerged, bell-like shapes
 Lava tubes contain speleothems composed of sulfates, mirabilite or opal. When the lava cools, precipitation occurs.

Calthemites
The usual definition of speleothem excludes secondary mineral deposits derived from concrete, lime, mortar, or other calcareous material (e.g. limestone and dolomite) outside the cave environment or in artificial caves (e.g. mines, tunnels), which can have similar shapes and forms as speleothems. Such secondary deposits in man-made structures are termed calthemites. Calthemites are often associated with concrete degradation, or due to leaching of lime, mortar, or other calcareous material.

Gallery

See also
Petrifying well

References

External links

 The Virtual Cave: an online guide to speleothems
 Mineral aggregates from carst caves, formed in capillary film solutions
 Gallery of speleothems from NPS Cave and Karst Program (archived on 23 January 2013)

Calcium minerals
Dinaric Alps
Dinaric karst formations
Incremental dating
Karst formations
Karst
Limestone
Paleoclimatology
Speleothems